Brad Allen is an American football official in the National Football League (NFL) since the 2014 NFL season, wearing uniform number 122.

A native of Lumberton, North Carolina (and a graduate of The University of North Carolina at Pembroke, formerly Pembroke State University), Allen began officiating football games at the high school, and later, ACC, levels. When he made his NFL officiating debut in 2014, he was originally going to be an umpire, but when long-time referee Mike Carey announced his retirement on June 24, 2014, Allen was given the referee position instead; this was the first time since 1962 that an NFL official in his first year of officiating was given that honor (Tommy Bell was the last NFL official to do so).

He called the 2007 Motor City Bowl, the 2009 International Bowl, the 2012 Rose Bowl and the 2014 Sugar Bowl.

Outside of officiating NFL games, Allen is executive director of the N.C. Senior Games, and the CEO of a non-profit. He also serves as clinic leader and booking supervisor for the Southern Officials Association.

2022 Crew 
 R: Brad Allen
 U: Duane Heydt
 DJ: Sarah Thomas
 LJ: Daniel Gallagher
 FJ: Rick Patterson
 SJ: Boris Cheek
 BJ: Greg Yette
 RO: Artenzia Young-Seigler
 RA: Larry Hanson

Statistics

References

Year of birth missing (living people)
Living people
National Football League officials
University of North Carolina at Pembroke alumni
People from Lumberton, North Carolina
American nonprofit chief executives